Barry Dunn (born 15 February 1952) is an English former footballer who made 47 appearances in the Football League playing as a left winger for Sunderland, Preston North End and Darlington. He also played non-league football for Newcastle Blue Star and Seaham Red Star.

References

1952 births
Living people
Footballers from Sunderland
English footballers
Association football forwards
Newcastle Blue Star F.C. players
Sunderland A.F.C. players
Preston North End F.C. players
Darlington F.C. players
Seaham Red Star F.C. players
English Football League players
Association football midfielders